The Journal of British Cinema and Television is a quarterly academic journal published by Edinburgh University Press in May, August and December of each year. It was established in 2004. Themed issues alternate with regular issues and every issue contains papers, book reviews, interviews and conferences.

See also
 List of film periodicals

External links 
 

Publications established in 2004
Quarterly journals
English-language journals
Media studies journals
Edinburgh University Press academic journals